The Escuela Central de Niñas (Central School for Girls) was the first girls' school in Paraguay. 

The school opened on 7 November 1869, under the direction of Doña Asunción Escalada.

References
 

Girls' schools in South America
Educational institutions established in 1869
1869 establishments in South America
Schools in Asunción